Robert "Bob" Dagnall (birth registered first ¼ 1932) is an English former professional rugby league footballer who played in the 1960s.

Background
Bob Dagnall's birth was registered in Prescot district, Lancashire, England.

Playing career

International honours
Bob Dagnall won caps for Great Britain while at St. Helens in 1961 against New Zealand (2 matches), in 1964 against France, and in 1965 against France.

Challenge Cup Final appearances
Bob Dagnall played  in St. Helens' 12-6 victory over Wigan in the 1961 Challenge Cup Final during the 1960–61 season at Wembley Stadium, London on Saturday 13 May 1961, in front of a crowd of 94,672.

County Cup Final appearances
Bob Dagnall played  in St. Helens' 15-9 victory over Swinton in the 1960 Lancashire County Cup Final during the 1960–61 season at Central Park, Wigan on Saturday 29 October 1960, played  in the 25-9 victory over Swinton in the 1961 Lancashire County Cup Final during the 1961–62 season at Central Park, Wigan on Saturday 11 November 1961, played  in the 7-4 victory over Swinton in the 1962 Lancashire County Cup Final during the 1962–63 season at Central Park, Wigan on Saturday 27 October 1962, played  in the 15-4 victory over Leigh in the 1963 Lancashire County Cup Final during the 1963–64 season at Station Road, Swinton on Saturday 26 October 1963, and played  in the 12-4 victory over Swinton in the 1964 Lancashire County Cup Final during the 1964–65 season at Central Park, Wigan on Saturday 24 October 1964.

BBC2 Floodlit Trophy Final appearances
Bob Dagnall played  in St. Helens' 0-4 defeat by Castleford in the 1965 BBC2 Floodlit Trophy Final during the 1965–66 season at Knowsley Road, St. Helens on Tuesday 14 December 1965.

Honoured at St Helens R.F.C.
Bob Dagnall is a St Helens R.F.C. Hall of Fame inductee.

References

External links
!Great Britain Statistics at englandrl.co.uk (statistics currently missing due to not having appeared for both Great Britain, and England)
Profile at saints.org.uk
Photograph '1961 series Great Britain v New Zealand' at rlhp.co.uk

1931 births
Living people
English rugby league players
Great Britain national rugby league team players
Pilkington Recs players
Rochdale Hornets players
Rugby league hookers
Rugby league players from Prescot
St Helens R.F.C. players